Emmett Till: How She Sent Him and How She Got Him Back is a painting completed by African-American artist, [./Lisa_Whittington_https://www.lisalovewhittington.com/info Lisa Whittington], in 2012. The painting is a portrait of a 14-year-old boy named Emmett Till. In 1955, he was visiting family in Money, Mississippi, from Chicago, when he was kidnapped and lynched by two white men for offending a white woman. Emmett Till's mother, Mamie Till, held an open casket funeral, and allowed the media to cover it, as well as the physical appearance of Emmett Till's body. She had said, "I wanted the world to see what they did to my baby."
As of February 2019, Emmett Till: How She Sent Him and How She Got Him Back, is displayed at the Mississippi Civil Rights Museum in Jackson, Mississippi. The original work is mixed media on canvas, and is 24 inches in length by 36 inches in height.

Inspiration 
In an interview with NBC News, Dr. Whittington claims that when she "saw a picture of Mamie Till receiving the body of her son at an Illinois terminal after his murder," she was inspired to create the painting. It took her "over ten years" to complete because of the emotional toll it took on her. She worked back and forth between Emmett Till: How She Sent Him and How She Got Him Back, and a separate painting Mamie Till: Grace Under Fire (2018).

Depiction 
The left side of the painting uses bright colors and clean lines to display Emmett Till's face before he was found lynched. The right side of the painting uses dark colors and texture to display Emmett Till's face after he was found lynched. The detail present in the painting on the right side of the face is consistent with reports done in an autopsy by the FBI, and with witness testimonies given in the same report. It is also accordant with photos of Emmett Till's face before and after the lynching, shared throughout the media after his death.

Response 

When a similar painting by Dana Shutz, Open Casket (2016), was shown at the 2017 Whitney Biennial, and sparked public debate, comparison in the media between the two pieces began.

Dr. Jared Sexton, author and professor of African American studies, describes Dr. Whittington's painting as such: "Careful and responsible is the leitmotif of Whittington's painting, as it is for most black artists, critics and curators who have weighed in on the matter representing Emmett Till and the whole range of issues that seem to condense around his image and likeness."

Influences 
Dr. Lisa Whittington's main influence is Vincent van Gogh. She is fascinated with his work, The Starry Night (1889). In a TED Talk, she says "nobody had ever given [the wind] color until Vincent Van Gogh did that for me." She is also influenced by Frida Kahlo, Jean-Michel Basquiat, Keith Haring, Pablo Picasso, and Romare Bearden.

Other Works 
Harlem Baby: My Lord What A Morning (2015), I Am A Man (2016), Mamie Till: Grace Under Fire (2018), Emmett, Until (2018), Except As A Punishment For Crime (2019)

See also
 Civil rights movement in popular culture

References

External links
 for Lisa Whittington

2012 paintings
Civil rights movement in popular culture
Paintings in the United States
Paintings about death
Emmett Till
Black people in art